The Shuangxi Park and Chinese Garden is a park and garden located in Shilin District, Taipei, Taiwan on Zhishan Road. The total area of the park is 2 hectares. Built in 1974 the southern Chinese courtyard style architecture. It features pavilions, courtyards, arch bridges, zig-zag bridges, and corridors. The landscape layout and construction was completed by Hu Guoli (胡國禮)

Features

Stone Lion
It is a Chinese belief that the lion is the animal representing authority and fealty. Thus, the cloudy-grained marble stone lions at the gates of the Chinese Garden – typically Chinese in style – guarding the main gates of the Garden. They are skillfully sculptured from Taiwanese Marble.

Pavilion
The Chinese Pavilion, Plateau and Tower represent the soul of the Chinese gardening art. The artistic features, typical of Chinese architecture have long been appreciated by man. The arrangement of these structures is very important and one of the essential rules of the structural arrangement is that the position of each structure must be balanced by its height and size according to Fengshui. Further, the building must be linked with plants, rocks, a winding stream and footpaths so as to create a poetical scene.
The design of the pavilions at the Shuangxi Garden is based on the style of Southern Chinese Pavilions, and decorated to blend harmoniously with the Garden.

Transportation
The area is accessible within walking distance east of Zhishan Station of Taipei Metro.

See also
 Chinese garden
 Zhishan Garden

References

External link

1974 establishments in Taiwan
Gardens in Taiwan
Chinese gardening styles
Garden design history of China
Parks established in 1974
Parks in Taipei